Comfort Deluxe is the debut studio album by Finnish Britpop band The Crash, released in 1999.

Track listing

Band members
Teemu Brunila – vocals, guitar
Samuli Haataja – bass guitar
Erkki Kaila – drums
Toni Ahola – keyboard

Chart positions

References

1999 debut albums
The Crash (band) albums